The Banco Convention of 1905, between the United States and Mexico, was negotiated and signed in 1905 and ratified by both nations in 1907. It resulted in 247 exchanges of bancos (land surrounded by bends in the river that became segregated by a cutoff often by the rapid erosion of the river channel) between the two nations from 1910 to 1976. Most of them were in the Lower Rio Grande Valley, the Presidio Valley and the El Paso-Juarez Valley. In 1927, the convention was applied to the short international border on the Colorado River.

Background

In 1884, a further treaty set out to clarify the 1848 Treaty of Guadalupe Hidalgo.  The Convention of November 12, 1884 established the rules for determining the location of the US-Mexico boundary when the meandering rivers of the international border transferred tracts of land from one bank of the river to the other.  The treaty stated that if the river changed course gradually through a process of soil erosion, then the boundary should follow the new course of the river.  However, a sudden change of course, for example one caused by a flood, would not affect the boundary. Nevertheless, the clarifications established in the treaty of 1884 did not resolve the question of land ownership.

The Convention of March 1, 1889 established the International Boundary Commission (IBC) to apply the rules in the 1884 Convention.  It was modified by the Banco Convention of March 20, 1905 to retain the courses of the Rio Grande and the Colorado River as international boundaries in the event of sudden changes.

Because the course of the Rio Grande was not static, to maintain the location of the river as the international boundary presented diplomatic and practical challenges.  The river changed course frequently where it flowed through areas of relatively loose alluvial soil, doubling back on itself as it wound its way through the Lower Rio Grande Valley.  Especially in times of flooding, tracts of land called "bancos" were created by avulsive changes that cut off entire oxbow-shaped meanders.

The result of these cut-offs was often confusion regarding sovereignty, land ownership, and law enforcement. The purpose of the 1905 convention was to eliminate these bancos from the effects of Article II of the US-Mexico Convention of 1884, to which they otherwise would have been subject, and to establish a more definitive means to settle matters.

Effects
The International Boundary and Water Commission was charged with implementing the convention.  Under the treaty, the following transfers involving Texas occurred from 1910 to 1976:

{| class="wikitable" style="text-align:right; font-size:87%; border:1; cellpadding:5; cellspacing:0;"
!scope="col" width="40px" |Year
!scope="col" width="43px" |No. of bancos
!scope="col" width="65px" |Acres to USA
!scope="col" width="65px" |Acres to Mexico
!scope="col" width="1px" |
!scope="col" width="40px" |Year
!scope="col" width="43px" |No. of bancos
!scope="col" width="65px" |Acres to USA
!scope="col" width="65px" |Acres to Mexico
|----
!1910
|57
|5,357.2
|3,101.2
|rowspan="12"|
!1942
|1
|63.3
|0
|----
!1912
|31
|1,094.4
|2,343.0
!1943
|4
|482.9
|100.5
|----
!1928
|42
|3,089.9
|1,407.8
!1944
|14
|253.7
|166.2
|----
!1930
|31
|4,685.6
|984.3
!1945
|16
|240.9
|333.5
|----
!1931
|4
|158.4
|328.7
!1946
|1
|185.8
|0
|----
!1932
|2
|159.7
|0
!1949
|2
|190.2
|281.9
|----
!1933
|1
|0
|122.1
!1956
|1
|508.3
|0
|----
!1934
|1
|278.1
|0
!1968
|1
|0
|154.6
|----
!1939
|1
|240.2
|0
!1970
|21
|449.8
|1,881.8
|----
!1940
|2
|0
|209.5
!1976
|6
|49.2
|0
|----
!1941
|6
|224.5
|246.9
!Total
|245
|
|
|----
|}

In 1927 under this convention, the U.S. acquired two bancos from Mexico at the Colorado River border with Arizona. Farmers Banco, covering , a part of the Cocopah Indian Reservation, was ceded to the U.S. with controversy.

Below is a list of the 247 bancos that were exchanged under the terms of the 1905 convention.  This information is also available as a kmz file at this location.

Note: For all 247 bancos, aerial images, including orthographic images, provide visible evidence of each location at the stated coordinates. The latitude and longitude coordinates are within the perimeter of each banco and were exactly located, as shown on the maps that were published with the corresponding minutes of the International Boundary and Water Commission, which officially transferred jurisdiction over each banco.

See also
 International Boundary and Water Commission
 Mexico–United States border
 List of United States treaties
 Treaty of Guadalupe Hidalgo
 Resaca (channel)

References

1905 treaties
Mexico–United States treaties
Treaties involving territorial changes
History of the Southwestern United States
History of United States expansionism
1905 in Mexico
1905 in the United States
Presidency of Theodore Roosevelt
Mexican-American history
Mexico–United States border
Texas border disputes
1905 in Washington, D.C.